Thomas James McAvoy (born September 17, 1938) is a senior United States district judge of the United States District Court for the Northern District of New York.

Education and career

McAvoy was born in Johnson City, New York and graduated from Villanova University with an Artium Baccalaureus degree in 1960 and Albany Law School with a Juris Doctor in 1964. A Republican, McAvoy was a practicing attorney in Binghamton, New York from 1964 to 1985. He was a member of the Broome County Legislature from 1971 to 1986.

Federal judicial service

McAvoy was recommended for a judicial appointment by Senator Al D'Amato. On January 29, 1986 he was nominated by President Ronald Reagan to the United States District Court for the Northern District of New York, to a new seat created by 98 Stat. 333. He was confirmed by the United States Senate on March 3, 1986, and received his commission on March 4, 1986. McAvoy served as Chief Judge from 1993 to 2000 and assumed senior status on September 17, 2003.

References

Sources
 
D'Amato Suggests Several as Judges, Arnold H. Lubasch, New York Times, February 24, 1985

1938 births
Living people
Villanova University alumni
Albany Law School alumni
New York (state) lawyers
New York (state) Republicans
County legislators in New York (state)
Judges of the United States District Court for the Northern District of New York
United States district court judges appointed by Ronald Reagan
20th-century American judges
21st-century American judges